Houston Person (born November 10, 1934) is an American jazz tenor saxophonist and record producer. Although he has performed in the hard bop and swing genres, he is most experienced in and best known for his work in soul jazz. He received the ‘Eubie Blake Jazz Award’ in 1982.

Biography

Person grew up in Florence, South Carolina, and first played piano before switching to tenor saxophone. He studied at South Carolina State College where he was inducted into the school's Hall of Fame in 1999.

In the United States Air Force, he joined a service band stationed in West Germany, and played with Don Ellis, Eddie Harris, Cedar Walton, and Leo Wright. He later continued his studies at Hartt College of Music in Hartford, Connecticut.

He first became known for a series of albums for Prestige in the 1960s.  Contrary to popular belief, he was never married to the vocalist Etta Jones, but did spend many years as her musical partner, recording, performing and touring, and for much of his career this association was what he was best known for. They first met playing in organist Johnny Hammond's band.

There are more than 75 albums recorded by Houston Person as a bandleader, on Prestige, Westbound, Mercury, Savoy, and Muse, and he has most recently been recording on HighNote. He has recorded with Charles Brown, Ron Carter, Bill Charlap, Charles Earland, Lena Horne, Etta Jones, Lou Rawls, Janis Siegel, Horace Silver, Dakota Staton, Cedar Walton, plus Billy Butler, Don Patterson, Grant Green, Sonny Phillips, Johnny "Hammond" Smith, Richard "Groove" Holmes and others.

Person has been a resident of Newark, New Jersey.

Discography

As leader
 Underground Soul! (Prestige, 1966)
 Chocomotive (Prestige, 1967) 
 Trust in Me (Prestige, 1967) 
 Blue Odyssey (Prestige, 1968) 
 Soul Dance! (Prestige, 1968)
 Goodness! (Prestige, 1969) 
 Truth! (Prestige, 1970)
 Person to Person! (Prestige, 1970)
 Houston Express (Prestige, 1971)
 Broken Windows, Empty Hallways (Prestige, 1972)
 Sweet Buns & Barbeque (Prestige, 1972)
 Island Episode (Prestige, 1971/1973 [1997])
 The Real Thing [live] (Eastbound, 1973) -2LP
 Houston Person '75 (Westbound/20th Century, 1975)
 Get Out'a My Way! (Westbound/20th Century, 1975)
 Pure Pleasure (Mercury, 1976)
 Harmony (Mercury, 1977)
 Stolen Sweets (Muse, 1976 [1977])
 Wild Flower (Muse, 1977 [1978])
 The Nearness of You (Muse, 1977 [1978]) 
 The Gospel Soul of Houston Person (Savoy, 1978)
 The Big Horn (Muse, 1976 [1979])
 Suspicions (Muse, 1980) 
 Very PERSONal (Muse, 1980 [1981])
 Heavy Juice (Muse, 1982) 
 Road Warriors (Greene Street, 1984) - with Les McCann 
 Creation (Greene Street, 1984) - with Roger Kellaway 
 Always on My Mind (Muse, 1985)
 The Talk of the Town (Muse, 1987)
 We Owe It All to Love (Baseline [UK], 1989)
 Basics (Muse, 1987 [1989]) 
 Something in Common (Muse, 1989 [1990]) - with Ron Carter
 The Party (Muse, 1989 [1991]) 
 Now's the Time (Muse, 1990) - with Ron Carter
 Just Friends (Muse, 1990 [1992]) - with Buddy Tate and Nat Simkins
 Why Not! (Muse, 1990) 
 The Lion and His Pride (Muse, 1991)
 Christmas with Houston Person and Friends (Muse, 1994) - with Randy Johnston, Etta Jones, Grady Tate, Benny Green [note: reissued as Santa Baby on Savoy in 2003]
 Horn to Horn (Muse, 1994 [1996]) - with Teddy Edwards
 Close Encounters (HighNote, 1996 [1999]) - with Teddy Edwards
 Person-ified (HighNote, 1996 [1997]) - with Richard Wynands, Ray Drummond, Kenny Washington 
 Lost & Found - with Charles Brown (32 Jazz, 1997) [note: first issue of a previously unreleased Muse album Sweet Slumber, recorded in 1991]
 The Opening Round (Savant, 1997) 
 Christmas With Houston Person and Etta Jones (32 Jazz, 1997) - compilation of various Muse material
 My Romance (HighNote, 1998) 
 Soft Lights (HighNote, 1999) 
 Together at Christmas (HighNote, 2000) - with Etta Jones
 The Way We Were: Live in Concert (HighNote, 2000 [2011]) - with Etta Jones
 In a Sentimental Mood (HighNote, 2000)
 Dialogues (HighNote, 2000 [2002]) - with Ron Carter
 Blue Velvet (HighNote, 2001)
 Sentimental Journey (HighNote, 2002)
 Social Call (HighNote, 2003) - with Paul Bollenback
 To Etta with Love (HighNote, 2004) - with Paul Bollenback
 You Taught My Heart to Sing (HighNote, 2004 [2006]) - with Bill Charlap
 All Soul (HighNote, 2005)
 Just Between Friends (HighNote, 2005 [2008]) - with Ron Carter
 Thinking of You (HighNote, 2007) 
 The Art and Soul of Houston Person (HighNote, 2008) -3CD
 Mellow (HighNote, 2009)
 Moment to Moment (HighNote, 2010) 
 So Nice (HighNote, 2011) 
 Naturally (HighNote, 2012) 
 Nice 'n' Easy (HighNote, 2013) 
 The Melody Lingers On (HighNote, 2014) - with Steve Nelson
 Something Personal (HighNote, 2015) 
 Chemistry (HighNote, 2015 [2016]) - with Ron Carter
 Rain or Shine (HighNote, 2017)
 Remember Love (HighNote, 2018) - with Ron Carter
 I'm Just a Lucky So and So (HighNote, 2019)
 Live in Paris (HighNote, 2019 [2021])
 Reminiscing at Rudy's (HighNote, 2022)

As Sideman
With The 3B's
 Soothin' 'N Groovin' with The 3B's (3B's Music, 1994)
With Gene Ammons
 The Boss Is Back! (Prestige, 1969)
With Charles Brown
 Blues and Other Love Songs (Muse, 1992)
With Paul (PB) Brown
Paul Brown Quartet Meets The Three Tenors (Brownstone, 1998)
With Billy Butler
 This Is Billy Butler! (Prestige, 1968)
 Yesterday, Today & Tomorrow (Prestige, 1970)
 Night Life (Prestige, 1971)
With Ron Carter
 Orfeu (Somethin' Else/Blue Note, 1999)
With Joey DeFrancesco
 All About My Girl (Muse, 1994)
 Plays Sinatra His Way (High Note, 1998 [rel. 2004])
With Charles Earland
 Black Talk! (Prestige, 1969)
Pleasant Afternoon (Muse, 1981)
With Grant Green
  Live at Club Mozambique (Blue Note, 1971 [rel. 2006])
With Tiny Grimes
 Profoundly Blue (Muse, 1973)
With Peter Hand Big Band
 The Wizard of Jazz: A Tribute to Harold Arlen (Savant, 2005 [rel. 2009])
 Out of Hand (Savant, 2013)
With Richard "Groove" Holmes
 Good Vibrations (Muse, 1977 [rel. 1980]) 
 Broadway (Muse, 1980)
 Blues All Day Long (Muse, 1988)
 Hot Tat (Muse, 1989 [rel. 1991])
With Randy Johnston
Detour Ahead (HighNote, 1998 [rel. 2001]) 
With Etta Jones
Etta Jones '75 (Westbound/20th Century, 1975)
Ms. Jones to You (Muse, 1976)
My Mother's Eyes (Muse, 1977)
If You Could See Me Now (Muse, 1978)
Save Your Love for Me (Muse, 1980)
Fine and Mellow (Muse, 1986)
I'll Be Seeing You (Muse, 1987)
Sugar (Muse, 1989)
Christmas with Etta Jones (Muse, 1990)
Reverse the Charges (Muse, 1992)
At Last (Muse, 1995)
The Melody Lingers On (HighNote, 1997)
My Buddy: Etta Jones Sings the Songs of Buddy Johnson (HighNote, 1998)
All the Way (HighNote, 1999)
Easy Living (HighNote, 2000)
Etta Jones Sings Lady Day (HighNote, 2001)
With Charles Kynard
 Afro-Disiac (Prestige, 1970)
With Johnny Lytle
 Fast Hands (Muse, 1980)
 Good Vibes (Muse, 1982)  
 Moonchild (Muse, 1992)
With Don Patterson
 Four Dimensions (Prestige, 1967)
 Oh Happy Day (Prestige, 1969)
 Tune Up! (Prestige, 1969)
With Sonny Phillips
 Sure 'Nuff (Prestige, 1969)
With Jimmy Ponder
Come On Down (Muse, 1991)
With Bernard Purdie
 Shaft (Prestige, 1971 [rel. 1973])
With Shirley Scott
  Oasis (Muse, 1989)
With Rhoda Scott
Feelin' the Groove (Verve, 1993)
With Janis Siegel
  Friday Night Special (Telarc, 2003)
With Horace Silver
  That Healin' Feelin' (Blue Note, 1970)
With Johnny "Hammond" Smith
 Mr. Wonderful (Riverside, 1963)
 A Little Taste (Riverside, 1963)
 The Stinger (Prestige, 1965)
 The Stinger Meets the Golden Thrush (Prestige, 1966) - with Byrdie Green
 Gettin' Up (Prestige, 1967)
 Soul Flowers (Prestige, 1967)
 Dirty Grape (Prestige, 1968)
 Nasty! (Prestige, 1968)
 Here It 'Tis (Prestige, 1970)
With Melvin Sparks
 Sparks! (Prestige, 1970)
With Warren Vaché
Horn of Plenty (Muse, 1993)

References

External links
Houston Person NAMM Oral History Program Interview (2006)

1934 births
Living people
People from Florence, South Carolina
Soul-jazz saxophonists
Hard bop saxophonists
Swing saxophonists
Post-bop saxophonists
Mainstream jazz saxophonists
American jazz tenor saxophonists
American male saxophonists
Savoy Records artists
South Carolina State University alumni
University of Hartford Hartt School alumni
Muse Records artists
Prestige Records artists
Musicians from Newark, New Jersey
21st-century American saxophonists
21st-century American male musicians
American male jazz musicians
The 3B's members
Statesmen of Jazz members
CTI Records artists
HighNote Records artists